Da Da Da (stylized as DA・DA・DA) is the second studio album by Japanese J-pop singer and songwriter Maki Ohguro. It was released on 28 April 1993 under B-Gram Records, on same day as the fourth single, "Wakaremashou Watashi Kara Kieteshimau Anata kara", which'll be included on the next album. This is the first album released by Being Inc. Album includes two singles, Dakara and Chotto, which raised her popularity as singer. The album reached No. 2 in its first week on the Oricon chart. The album charted for 42 weeks and sold 746,000 copies.

Track listing
All tracks arranged by Takeshi Hayama.

References

Being Inc. albums
Japanese-language albums
1993 albums
Maki Ohguro albums
Albums produced by Daiko Nagato